Football Club Sporting Genzano is an Italian association football club located in Genzano di Lucania, Basilicata. It currently plays in the Serie D. Its colors are white and red.

References

External links
 Official site

Association football clubs established in 1964
Football clubs in Basilicata
Italian football clubs established in 1964